Chuckey-Doak High School is located in Tusculum, Tennessee, United States, with an Afton address. It is one of four high schools in the Greene County, Tennessee School System and serves the eastern part of the county, including the city of Tusculum and the communities of Afton, Chuckey and the Greene County portion of Limestone.

Feeder schools
 Chuckey Elementary
 Doak Elementary
 Chuckey-Doak Middle School

References

External links

 http://cdhs.greenek12.org/

Public high schools in Tennessee
Schools in Greene County, Tennessee
Tusculum, Tennessee
Educational institutions established in 1959
1959 establishments in Tennessee